BBC Radio One Live in Concert was a live album by Dexys Midnight Runners, recorded for the BBC in 1982 and released in 1995. It was the group's first official live album and remained their only official live album until the release of The Projected Passion Revue in 2007 (from a 1981 recording). The album is unique as it is Dexys' only live recording where the members of The Projected Passion Revue horn section (Big Jim Paterson, Paul Speare, and Brian Maurice) are present alongside the Too-Rye-Ay strings (Helen O'Hara and Steve Brennan).  Immediately after this concert, the horn section left the group and formed The TKO Horns.

This concert is included in full (including one track, "I'll Show You", omitted from this release) on the second disc of the 2007 Too-Rye-Ay Deluxe Edition release.

Track listing
 "TSOP (The Sound of Philadelphia)" (Kenneth Gamble, Leon Huff) – 4:19
 "Burn It Down" (Rowland) – 3:58
 "Let's Make This Precious" (Paterson, Rowland) – 4:18
 "Jackie Wilson Said (I'm in Heaven When You Smile)" (Van Morrison) – 3:07
 "Come on Eileen" (Adams, Billingham, Paterson, Rowland) – 6:30
 "Respect" (Otis Redding) – 6:25
 "Soon" (Paterson, Rowland) – 1:34
 "Plan B" (Paterson, Rowland) – 4:04
 "Geno" (Paterson, Rowland) – 3:29
 "Old" (Paterson, Rowland) – 4:36
 "The Celtic Soul Brothers" (Billingham, Paterson, Rowland) – 2:47
 "There, There, My Dear" (Archer, Rowland) – 5:22
 "Show Me" (Paterson, Rowland) – 3:38

Personnel
 Kevin Rowland – guitar, vocals
 Seb Shelton – drums
 Giorgio Kilkenny – bass
 Kevin "Billy" Adams – banjo, guitar
 Mickey Billingham – organ, piano, accordion
 "Big" Jim Paterson – trombone
 Paul Speare – saxophone, flute, tin whistle
 Brian Maurice – saxophone
 Helen O'Hara – violin
 Steve Brennan – violin

References

Dexys Midnight Runners albums
BBC Radio recordings
1995 live albums